The Hindustan Aeronautics HA-31 Basant (en: Spring) is a 1970s Indian agricultural monoplane built by Hindustan Aeronautics.

Hindustan Aeronautics started to design an agricultural aircraft in 1968 designated the HAL-31 Mk 1 with a cockpit directly over the wing leading edge. It was re-designed as the HA-31 Mk II Basant and first flew on the 30 March 1972. The Basant is a conventional braced low-wing monoplane with a fixed tailwheel landing gear and powered by a 400 hp (298 kW) Avco Lycoming IO-720 piston engine. It had a raised cockpit to give the pilot a good all-round view during spraying operations. Production ended in 1980 after 39 aircraft had been built.

Specifications (Mk II)

See also

References

Notes

Bibliography
 Taylor, J. W. R. (ed.). Jane's All the World's Aircraft 1980–81. London: Jane's, 1981.  .
 The Illustrated Encyclopedia of Aircraft (Part Work 1982–1985), 1985, Orbis Publishing, Page 2160

External links
 

1970s Indian agricultural aircraft
Basant
Single-engined tractor aircraft
Low-wing aircraft
Aircraft first flown in 1972